Colin Fox is the name of:

 Colin Fox (politician) (born 1959), Scottish politician
 Colin Fox (actor) (born 1938), Canadian actor